Jeanne Sauvé Catholic School is a French-language immersion elementary school in Stratford, Ontario canada. It is part of the Huron-Perth Catholic District School Board, and has been called "truly outstanding" by David Johnson, Professor of Economics at Wilfrid Laurier University in his 2005 study "Ontario's Best Public Schools: An Update to Signposts of Success".

Notable alumni
Alonzo Holt
Justin Bieber Attended from First Grade through Sixth Grade.

References

French immersion schools in Canada
Education in Stratford, Ontario